The 1998 NCAA Division I-AA football season, part of college football in the United States organized by the National Collegiate Athletic Association (NCAA) at the Division I-AA level, began in August 1998, and concluded with the 1998 NCAA Division I-AA Football Championship Game on December 19, 1998, at Finley Stadium in Chattanooga, Tennessee. The UMass Minutemen won their first I-AA championship, defeating the Georgia Southern Eagles by a score of 55−43.

Conference changes and new programs

Conference standings

Conference champions

Postseason

NCAA Division I-AA playoff bracket

* Denotes host institution

Source:

References